The Ordâncușa (also: Ordencușa) is a left tributary of the river Gârda Seacă in Romania. It discharges into the Gârda Seacă near Gârda de Sus.

References

Rivers of Romania
Rivers of Alba County